Cummins Station is a historic building near Union Station in Nashville, Tennessee, U.S.. It was built with reinforced concrete in 1906. It was built for William J. Cummins, the chairman of the Bon Air Coal and Iron Corporation, and other investors by the Oliver Contracting Company. Upon its completion, it was the largest reinforced concrete industrial warehouse in the world. It has been listed on the National Register of Historic Places since November 17, 1983.

References

External links 

 Cummins Station office building site

Industrial buildings and structures on the National Register of Historic Places in Tennessee
Buildings and structures completed in 1906
National Register of Historic Places in Nashville, Tennessee
Office buildings in Nashville, Tennessee
Warehouses on the National Register of Historic Places
1906 establishments in Tennessee